José Manuel Pérez-Aicart (born July 3, 1982 in Castellón) is a Spanish auto racing driver.

Career

Single-seaters
Pérez-Aicart finished third in the 2001 Spanish Formula Three Championship. He then competed in the Formula Nissan 2000 series in 2002, finishing fourth. In 2003, Pérez-Aicart raced in Spanish F3 and World Series by Nissan, and continued in Spanish F3 in 2004, and in 2005, when he was runner-up to Andy Soucek.

GTs and Touring cars
Pérez-Aicart was second in the 2006 International GT Open and fifth in the Spanish GT Championship. In 2007 he won the GTB class of the Spanish GT Championship as well as the SEAT Leon Supercopa. He was rewarded for winning the Leon Supercopa with a one-off appearance for SEAT Sport in the World Touring Car Championship at the 2008 Race of Spain. He also raced in Spanish GT and the International GT Open for Sun-Red.

References

External links
 
 

1982 births
Living people
Sportspeople from Castellón de la Plana
Spanish racing drivers
Euroformula Open Championship drivers
World Touring Car Championship drivers
International GT Open drivers
Blancpain Endurance Series drivers
24 Hours of Spa drivers
24H Series drivers
SMP Racing drivers
FIA Motorsport Games drivers
Campos Racing drivers
Cupra Racing drivers